The 1901 California Golden Bears football team was an American football team that represented the University of California as an independent during the 1901 college football season. In its first season under head coach Frank W. Simpson, the team compiled a 9–0–1 record and outscored opponents by a total of 106 to 15.

Schedule

References

California
California Golden Bears football seasons
College football undefeated seasons
California Golden Bears football